Leon Wesley Walls (born July 30, 1957) is an American singer-songwriter, and guitarist born in Cincinnati, Ohio, to Virgil and Dorothy Walls. The third of four children, Walls was educated in the Covington, Kentucky, school system, where he attended Holmes High School. His songs are direct with familiar traditional country themes such as love, drinking, betrayal and reflect on life's trials and hardships. He now resides in Palm Springs, California, and is signed with Statue Records, and is a member of SoundClick.com.

Discography 
 Lease On Your Heart (1989)
 Blue Moon (1990)
 Someday (1999)
 Leon Wesley Walls (2000)
 She's Already Gone (2002)
 Day Of Retribution (2003)
 Why Pretend (2004)
 Breakaway (2005)

References 
 Leon Wesley Walls at Official Web Site
 
 Leon Wesley Walls at Soundclick.com

1957 births
Living people
American country singer-songwriters
Musicians from Cincinnati
Country musicians from Ohio
Singer-songwriters from Ohio